The 1862 New Jersey gubernatorial election was held on November 4, 1862. Democratic nominee Joel Parker defeated Republican nominee Marcus Lawrence Ward with 56.8% of the vote.

General election

Candidates
Joel Parker, Democratic
Marcus Lawrence Ward, Republican

Results

References

1862
Gubernatorial
New Jersey
November 1862 events